The 2015 Tulsa Golden Hurricane football team represented the University of Tulsa during the 2015 NCAA Division I FBS football season. They were led by first-year head coach Philip Montgomery and played their home games at Skelly Field at H. A. Chapman Stadium. They were second year members of the American Athletic Conference in the Western Division. They finished the season 6–7, 3–5 in American Athletic play to finish in fourth place in the Western Division. They were invited to the Independence Bowl where they lost to Virginia Tech.

Previous season
The 2014 Tulsa Golden Hurricane football team finished the season with a 2–10 record, including a 2–6 record in the American Athletic Conference. Head Coach Bill Blankenship was fired after the season. Philip Montgomery was hired to be the new head coach.

Schedule

Game summaries

Florida Atlantic

at New Mexico

at Oklahoma

Houston

Louisiana–Monroe

at East Carolina

Memphis

at SMU

UCF

at Cincinnati

Navy

at Tulane

vs. Virginia Tech–Independence Bowl

Roster

References

Tulsa
Tulsa Golden Hurricane football seasons
Tulsa Golden Hurricane football